

Events

Births

Deaths
 Guiraut Riquier (born 1230), an Occitan troubadour

13th-century poetry
Poetry